Anamo, also known as Paup, is a village on the north coast of Papua New Guinea in the Sandaun Province. It is a coastal settlement that is located to the east of Aitape, at the mouth of the Driniumor River. It is located in the East Aitape Rural LLG.

History 
The Battle of Driniumor River took place around Anamo in 1944. Gerald L. Endl was awarded the Medal of Honor for his actions near Anamo. During the battle, the Americans suffered almost 3,000 casualties including 440 killed while the Japanese lost 8,000–10,000 men.

See also
East Aitape Rural LLG

References

Populated places in Sandaun Province